Hermán Gaviria Carvajal (27 November 1969 – 24 October 2002) was a Colombian footballer, who played as a central midfielder.

Football career
During his career, Gaviria played for Atlético Nacional, Deportes Tolima, Deportivo Cali, Atlético Bucaramanga and Shonan Bellmare of the J2 League.

Gaviria participated in the football tournament at the 1992 Summer Olympics in Barcelona, Spain, scoring twice, and appeared at three stagings of the Copa América, earning two third-place finishes in the 1993 and 1995 editions.

He earned a total of 27 caps for his national team, scoring 3 goals and being selected for the 1994 FIFA World Cup in the United States; in the last group stage match, as Colombia was eliminated unless they beat Switzerland and the USA beat Romania, he netted in a 2–0 win against Switzerland.

Death
Gaviria died on 24 October 2002, when he and teammate Giovanni Córdoba were hit by lightning during a practice session with Deportivo Cali. Gaviria was killed instantly, though he was not pronounced dead until arriving at Valle de Lilli Hospital; Córdoba died three days later. Nicknamed "Carepa" after his hometown in Antioquia Department, Gaviria left a wife and two children, and was only 32 years old.

Club statistics

National team statistics

International goals 
Colombia score listed first, score column indicates score after each Hernán Gaviria goal.

References

External links

1969 births
2002 deaths
Sportspeople from Antioquia Department
Colombian footballers
Association football midfielders
Categoría Primera A players
Atlético Nacional footballers
Deportes Tolima footballers
Deportivo Cali footballers
Atlético Bucaramanga footballers
J2 League players
Shonan Bellmare players
Colombia international footballers
1994 FIFA World Cup players
1993 Copa América players
1995 Copa América players
1997 Copa América players
Olympic footballers of Colombia
Footballers at the 1992 Summer Olympics
Colombian expatriate footballers
Expatriate footballers in Japan
Colombian expatriate sportspeople in Japan
Deaths from lightning strikes
Association football players who died while playing
Sport deaths in Colombia
Natural disaster deaths in Colombia